Lina Alexandrovna Kudriavtseva (born 4 November 2002) is a Russian pair skater. With her former skating partner, Ilia Spiridonov, she is the 2018 CS Ondrej Nepela Trophy bronze medalist and the 2019 Denis Ten Memorial Challenge champion.

Programs 
 With Spiridonov

Competitive highlights 
CS: Challenger Series

 With Spiridonov

Detailed results 
ISU Personal Best highlighted in bold.

 With Spiridonov

References

External links 

 

2002 births
Living people
Russian female pair skaters
Sportspeople from Tver